Julie Dall Høgh  (born 30 August 1999) is a Danish curler from Copenhagen playing since she was six. She played for Denmark placing tenth in the 2018 Winter Olympics. She speaks Danish and English.

Personal life
As of 2020 she is a student.

References

External links
 

1999 births
Living people
Curlers at the 2018 Winter Olympics
Danish female curlers
Olympic curlers of Denmark
Sportspeople from Copenhagen
21st-century Danish women